Charlie Henry (born c. 1985) is an American basketball coach, currently the head coach for the  Georgia Southern of the Sun Belt Conference.

Coaching career
In 2014 Henry was promoted to assistant coach at Iowa State University by head coach Fred Hoiberg.  In July 2015, Henry was named an assistant coach of the Chicago Bulls under former Iowa State University head coach Fred Hoiberg.  In August 2017, the Windy City Bulls hired him to be their head coach.

Head coaching record

References

Living people
American men's basketball coaches
American men's basketball players
Basketball coaches from Michigan
Basketball players from Michigan
Chicago Bulls assistant coaches
College men's basketball head coaches in the United States
Georgia Southern Eagles men's basketball coaches
Iowa State Cyclones men's basketball coaches
Madonna Crusaders men's basketball players
Windy City Bulls coaches
People from Canton, Michigan
1985 births